Tuğçe Şahutoğlu (born May 1, 1988 in Mersin, Turkey) is a Turkish female hammer thrower. She was a student of physical education at the vocational college of Aksaray University.

Şahutoğlu began with hammer throw at the age of twelve promoted by her teacher of physical education. She is the holder of records at national level in several age categories. In May 2012, she improved her personal best from 70.09 m achieved in 2011 to 74.17 m breaking the national record that was held by Sviatlana Sudak Torun with 70.74 m set in July 2008 at Minsk, Belarus.

Tuğçe Şahutoğlu participated in the hammer throw event at the 2012 Summer Olympics, where she finished 24th in the qualification round and failed to make the final.

Şahutoğlu tested positive for the anabolic steroid Stanozolol in May 2013 and was given a two-year ban from competition. The Turkish Athletics Federation named her in August 2013 as one of 31 Turkish athletes to have been sanctioned for a doping offence in that year. Her period of ineligibility lasted until 7 June 2015.

She competed at the 2016 Summer Olympics, finishing 10th in her qualifying pool, not reaching the final.

References

External links

1988 births
Living people
Sportspeople from Mersin
Doping cases in athletics
Turkish sportspeople in doping cases
Turkish female hammer throwers
Beşiktaş J.K. athletes
Fenerbahçe athletes
Olympic athletes of Turkey
Athletes (track and field) at the 2012 Summer Olympics
Athletes (track and field) at the 2016 Summer Olympics
Athletes (track and field) at the 2018 Mediterranean Games
Mediterranean Games competitors for Turkey
Athletes (track and field) at the 2020 Summer Olympics
Olympic female hammer throwers
21st-century Turkish women